Marsha Hunt may refer to:

 Marsha Hunt (actress, born 1917) (1917–2022), American film, theatre and television actress
 Marsha Hunt (actress, born 1946) (born 1946), American singer, novelist, actress and model